Jean-Charles Bédard (November 4, 1766 - July 2, 1825) was a Quebec born priest and Sulpician.

External links 
 Biography at the Dictionary of Canadian Biography Online

19th-century Canadian Roman Catholic priests
1766 births
1825 deaths
18th-century Canadian Roman Catholic priests